The Marsh Hen is an American trailerable sailboat that was designed by Reuben Trane as a pocket cruiser and first built in 1981.

Production
The design was built by Reuben Trane's Florida Bay Boat Company in the United States. A total of 40 boats were completed between 1981 and 1987 when the company went out of business. A series of other builders acquired the molds for the Marsh Hen and the company's other designs and resumed production of some models on a limited basis. Other builders included Mirage Fiberglass (1988-1991), Custom Fiberglass (1992-1997), Sovereign America (1997) and Nimble Boats (1998-2003). Production of the design was curtailed by 2003 and the molds purchased by Marine Concepts, although no further boats have been built.

Design
The Marsh Hen is a recreational centerboard boat, built predominantly of fiberglass, with teak wood trim. It has a catboat spritsail rig, with aluminum spars. The double-ended, canoe-type hull has a plumb stem, an angled transom, a shallow-draft, transom-hung rudder controlled by a teak tiller and retractable centerboard. It displaces .

The boat is normally fitted with a small, well-mounted, outboard motor for docking and maneuvering, but also can be rowed and is equipped with oarlocks.

The open-boat design has a dodger that was factory-supplied as standard equipment. This acts as a sort of cabin top to provide sleeping accommodation for two people. The boat has a built-in ice chest and a portable-type head along with six lockers for stowage.

For sailing the design is equipped with built-in flotation and a self-bailing cockpit.

Operational history
In a 1994 review Richard Sherwood wrote that the "hull shape has evolved from working boats of the Chesapeake, and the rudder and spritsail rig are also traditional. The Marsh Hen was designed as a pocket cruiser."

See also
List of sailing boat types

Related development
Bay Hen 21
Peep Hen 14

References

1980s sailboat type designs
Sailing yachts
Trailer sailers
Sailboat type designs by Reuben Trane
Sailboat types built by the Florida Bay Boat Company
Sailboat types built by Mirage Fiberglass